Ben Hur is an unincorporated community in Mariposa County, California.

A post office operated at Ben Hur from 1890 to 1902, and after moving from 1904 to 1951. The name comes from the hero of the novel Ben-Hur.

References

Unincorporated communities in California
Unincorporated communities in Mariposa County, California